Tamba Taylor (also spellt 'Tailor') was a long-serving paramount chief of the Kissi people, Lofa County, Liberia. Taylor served as part of the collective presidency of Liberia 1995-1997.

He was born on September 29, 1898 in a Kissi family in Milimalah, Kissi Chiefdom (in present-day Foya District). His name was Tamba Lamie Kongor. He received no formal education. He later changed his name to 'Taylor', due to his profession as a tailor. He would later claim to have sewn clothes for Ethiopian emperor Haile Selassie and Ghanian President Kwame Nkrumah.

He became paramount chief in 1957. He served on various national commissions, most notably the National Unification Programme Taylor of President William Tubman. Taylor became popularly known as 'the millionaire of Lofa'. He was rumoured to have had dozens of wives and would have fathered some 200 children.

During Samuel Doe's period as leader of the People's Redemption Council ruling Liberia in the 1980s, Doe sought Taylor's support for the junta government but Taylor didn't heed the call.

During the First Liberian Civil War, following the creation of the Liberian National Transitional Government, Taylor's name was proposed as a potential chairman of the Council of State (a provisional collective Presidency) by National Patriotic Front of Liberia leader Charles Taylor (who has no relation to Tamba Taylor). The December 21, 1994 Accra Agreements outlined that Tamba Taylor would chair a new Council of State, but the Accra Agreements were never implemented. Tamba Taylor became one of six members of the Council of State chaired by Wilton G. S. Sankawulo installed on September 1, 1995. When the Council of State was restructured after the 1996 Abuja Accords, Tamba Taylor retained his seat on the Council. However, Tamba Taylor's participation on the Council of State was largely symbolic - in practice he was often excluded from procedings or unable to follow the conversations due to language barriers.

Taylor died in October 2000. He was succeded as paramount chief by his son Momo S. Taylor. A community hall in Foya District, the Tamba Lamie Taylor Council, is named after Tamba Taylor.

References

Members of the Council of State
1898 births
2000 deaths
People from Lofa County
Tribal chiefs